The Barclays Center Classic is an annual early season college basketball tournament that was inaugurated in 2012. Each of the eight schools plays four games, with the bracketed portion of the tournament concluding at the tournament's namesake Barclays Center in Brooklyn, New York.

History
The first tournament was held as a five-team round-robin tournament. Most games were at campus sites; a doubleheader featuring Kentucky and Maryland on ESPN with an undercard game featuring LIU Brooklyn and Morehead State served as the centerpiece of the tournament.

2012

Final standings

2013
The 2013 edition was expanded to eight teams, with each team playing four games. Four schools- Penn State, Georgia Tech, Ole Miss, and St. John's advancing to Brooklyn for the semifinals, with the remaining schools playing out a second bracket at a campus site, Monmouth's Multipurpose Activity Center in West Long Branch, New Jersey.

Barclays Center bracket

Campus site bracket
The campus site portion of the Classic took place at Monmouth's Multipurpose Activity Center in West Long Branch, New Jersey.

2014
The 2014 edition of the Classic is the same as the 2013 edition. Four schools- Rutgers, Vanderbilt, LaSalle, and Virginia will play in Brooklyn for the semifinals, consolation and championship game, with the remaining schools playing out a second bracket at a campus site, the Yanitelli Center in Jersey City, New Jersey.

Barclays Center bracket

Campus Site Bracket
The campus site portion of the Classic took place at Saint Peter's Yanitelli Center in Jersey City, New Jersey.

2015

Four schools: Cincinnati, George Washington, Nebraska and Tennessee will play in Brooklyn for the semifinals, championship and consolation, with the remaining schools playing out a second bracket at Christl Arena in West Point, New York.

The opening round will be played November 22 and 24 at various sites around the country.

Opening Round

November 22, 2015
Cincinnati 99
Arkansas–Pine Bluff 50

Fifth Third Arena, Cincinnati, OH

George Washington 92
Army 81

Charles E. Smith Center, Washington, D.C.

Nebraska 92
Southeastern Louisiana 65

Pinnacle Bank Arena, Lincoln, NE

Tennessee 89
Gardner–Webb 64

Thompson-Boling Arena, Knoxville, TN

November 24, 2015
 Cincinnati 64
 Southeastern Louisiana 49

Fifth Third Arena, Cincinnati, OH

 George Washington 94
 Gardner–Webb 65

Charles E. Smith Center, Washington, D.C.

 Nebraska 67
 Arkansas–Pine Bluff 44

Pinnacle Bank Arena, Lincoln, NE

 Tennessee 95
 Army 80

Thompson-Boling Arena, Knoxville, TN

Barclays Center bracket

Cincinnati won its first title, with George Washington, Nebraska, and Tennessee finishing 2nd, 3rd, and 4th respectively.

Campus Site Bracket
The campus site portion of the Classic took place at Christl Arena in West Point, New York.

2016

Four schools: Boston College, Kansas State, Maryland and Richmond will play in Brooklyn for the semifinals, championship and consolation.
The opening round will be played November 20 and 22 at various sites.

Opening Round

November 20, 2016
Boston College  82
Stony Brook  75 
Conte Forum, Chestnut Hill, MA

Maryland  71
Towson  66
Xfinity Center, College Park, MD

Kansas State  89
Hampton  67 
Bramlage Coliseum, Manhattan, KS

Richmond  81
Robert Morris  69 
Robins Center, Richmond, VA

November 22, 2016
Boston College  80
Towson  70
Conte Forum, Chestnut Hill, MA

Maryland  77
Stony Brook  63 
Xfinity Center, College Park, MD

Kansas State  61
Robert Morris  40 
Bramlage Coliseum, Manhattan, KS

Richmond  65
Hampton  52 
Robins Center, Richmond, VA

Barclays Center bracket

Campus Site Bracket
The campus site portion of the Classic took place at SECU Arena in Towson, Maryland.

2017
Four schools: Alabama, BYU, Minnesota, and Massachusetts will play in Brooklyn.  The opening round will be played November 17, 18, 19, and 21 at various sites.  It was announced that the format of the Barclays Center Classic was changed from a four team tournament to a four team round robin... Barclays Center round games will be played November 25 at the Steinberg Wellness Center on the campus of LIU Brooklyn in Long Island, New York, then November 26 at Barclays Center

Opening Round

Barclays Center Round

Campus Site Bracket
The campus site portion will take place at Gallagher Center in Lewiston, New York.

2018

2019

See also
Legends Classic (basketball tournament)

References

External links
Barclays Center Classic

2012 establishments in New York City
2012 in sports in New York City
21st century in Brooklyn
Basketball competitions in New York City
College men's basketball competitions in the United States
College sports in New York City
Prospect Heights, Brooklyn
Recurring sporting events established in 2012
Sports in Brooklyn